The following lists significant events and births that happened during 1992 in Kenya:

Events

August
 ?? August — FORD split into two factions, FORD-Asili and FORD-Kenya

December
 29 December - Daniel arap Moi is re-elected as president of Kenya

Unknown date
 5000 people are killed and 75000 displaced in ethnic conflict in the Rift Valley Province

Births
 9 October - Caleb Mwangangi Ndiku, Distance runner

References

 
Kenya
Kenya
1990s in Kenya
Years of the 20th century in Kenya